Bhayangi is a small hamlet in Khatauli Tehsil in Muzaffarnagar District of Uttar Pradesh State, India.

Overview
Bhayangi is a small village located on the main G.T.Road (Delhi -Dehradun Highway) near Khatauli bypass. Village Bhayangi Founded by Thakur Bhagmal Singh before 400 Years.

References

 http://sec.up.nic.in/ElecLive/resultsearch.aspx

Villages in Muzaffarnagar district